Néstor Adrián Girolami (born May 22, 1989 in Cordoba Province), also known by the nickname "Bebu", is an Argentine racing driver.

His brother Franco is also racing driver.

Career
He began competing in karts in 1993. He remained in this discipline until 2005. The following year he made his debut in Formula Renault Argentina and the next he was runner-up, as well as in Formula Renault Plus.

He made his debut in TC 2000 in 2007, racing in one of his participations with the official Honda Argentina team.

In 2008 it went to TC Pista and Turismo Nacional and in 2009 it returned to TC 2000 and debuted in Turismo Carretera and Top Race V6.

In the 2011 Turismo Carretera season, Girolami achieved his first victory and qualified for the play-off. But in the penultimate race, he was involved in Guido Falaschi's fatal accident. Another serious accident in 2013 caused his suspension and subsequent separation from this series.

After competing with the official teams of the national subsidiaries of Honda and Renault in TC 2000, he joined the Peugeot team in the 2012 season of the series. That year he achieved two victories and in 2014 and 2015 he would win the championships with a total of seven victories. After this, he left the championship to carry out the full season of Stock Car Brasil.

He made his World Touring Car Championship debut at the Race of Slovakia in 2015 in a Honda Civic WTCC run by NIKA International, scoring points on his debut with a 10th-place finish. He competed in the 2017 World Touring Car Championship for Polestar Cyan Racing and took his first win in China. The team left the series after the season and Girolami returned to Súper TC 2000 and Top Race V6 in 2018. In TRV6 he finished third in the championship, behind his brother Franco and Agustín Canapino.

For 2019 he moved to the World Touring Car Cup to compete in a Honda Civic Type R TCR run by Münnich Motorsport. The 2019 season saw him take three wins, including two in a row in Hungary.

Racing record

Complete Stock Car Brasil results

‡ Ineligible for championship points.
† Driver did not finish the race, but was classified as he completed over 90% of the race distance.

Complete World Touring Car Championship results
(key) (Races in bold indicate pole position) (Races in italics indicate fastest lap)

‡ Half points awarded as less than 75% of race distance was completed.

Complete World Touring Car Cup results
(key) (Races in bold indicate pole position) (Races in italics indicate fastest lap)

† Driver did not finish the race, but was classified as he completed over 90% of the race distance.

Complete TCR Europe Touring Car Series results
(key) (Races in bold indicate pole position) (Races in italics indicate fastest lap)

24 Hours of Nürburgring results

References

External links

 Official website

1989 births
Living people
Sportspeople from Córdoba Province, Argentina
Argentine racing drivers
TC 2000 Championship drivers
Turismo Carretera drivers
Top Race V6 drivers
Formula Renault Argentina drivers
Formula Renault Eurocup drivers
Stock Car Brasil drivers
World Touring Car Championship drivers
World Touring Car Cup drivers
Súper TC 2000 drivers
Jenzer Motorsport drivers
Italian Formula Renault 2.0 drivers
Nürburgring 24 Hours drivers
TCR Europe Touring Car Series drivers